William Amos Spring (17 May 1880 – 14 March 1958) was an English first-class cricketer active 1903–14 who played for Surrey. He was born in Dulwich; died in Enfield, Middlesex.

References

1880 births
1958 deaths
English cricketers
Surrey cricketers